Shah Lutufullah Qadri, was a great saint of his era. He was not only saint of Qadriya lineage but Sindhi and Persian language poet too. He was born in small village Agham Kot, Talka Matli, (now district Badin) during Mughal Dynasty ruled over Sindh.

Poetry
هي جي فاني ٿئا ي الله ۾، موٽن تن محال

اُن وڃائي وجود کي حاصل ڪيو حال

تني سندو قال، اتانگھان اتانگھ ٿيو

See also
Shah Inayat Shaheed

References

Sindhi culture
17th-century poets
1611 births
1669 deaths